The Kiss of the Sphinx is an oil on canvas painting of 1895 by the German symbolist artist Franz Stuck. It was painted in the same year that Stuck became a professor at Academy of Fine Arts, Munich. The iconography of a sensuous, dangerous femme fatale is a recurring item in Stuck's work.

References

1895 paintings
Paintings by Franz von Stuck
Paintings in the collection of the Museum of Fine Arts (Budapest)